The mass media in Syria consists primarily of television, radio, Internet, film and print.  The national language of Syria is Arabic but some publications and broadcasts are also available in English and French.  While television is the most popular medium in Syria, the Internet has become a widely utilized vehicle to disseminate content.  Transcending all available media, the government seeks to control what Syrians see by restricting coverage from outside sources. Publications and broadcasts are monitored by members of the government. All mass media outlets are under the supervision of the Ministry of Information. Third article of the 2013 Information Ministry guidelines stipulate that purpose of all media outlets is "to enlighten public opinion" in line with the ideological doctrines "of the Arab Socialist Ba’ath Party and the policy of the state". 

Syria is ranked as one of the most dangerous places in the world for journalists. There were 28 journalists killed in combat in 2012. Between 2011 and 2020, more than 700 civilian journalists have been executed in Syria. More than 400 journalists were arrested or kidnapped in the course of the Syrian civil war. More than a third of independent journalists reporting on the war has been forced to flee, following government capture of territories in Southern and Eastern Syria during 2016-2018.

Media
Public media journalists practice self-censorship. Public media consists of television, print, film, radio and internet and social media.

Print 
According to Human Rights Watch, The Arab Establishment for Distribution of Printed Products, which is affiliated with the Ministry of Information, vets all newspapers prior to distribution. The only two private daily newspapers covering political topics that have succeeded in staying open are owned by businessmen closely tied to the regime: Baladna and Alwatan. Alwatan, a private daily published by businessman Rami Makhlouf, President Assad's cousin, was launched in 2006.  United Group, a major advertising group owned by Majd Suleiman, son of a former senior intelligence officer (Bahjat Suleiman), owns and operates the private daily Baladna. 

Since the outbreak of Syrian Revolution in 2011, Assad regime has further restricted media activities. All independent prints are banned and as of 2020, only three government-run dailies are permitted to be published in Syria: Al-Watan, Tishreen and Al-Ba'ath.

Television

There is one main broadcaster for both television and radio called the General Organization of Radio and Television of Syria (ORTAS). It was founded in 1960 and is based in Damascus. The channel has programs in Arabic, English and French. TV is the most popular media in Syria.

Satellite channels
Addounia TV
Arrai TV
Cham TV
Massaya TV
Lana TV
Sama TV
Spacetoon
General Organization of Radio and TV (Syria) (RTV)
Noor Al-Sham
Syria TV
Syrian Drama TV
Syrian Education TV
Syrian Medical TV
Syrian News Channel
Talaqie TV

Terrestrial channels
Channel 1 (Terrestrial, with Arabic focus)
Channel 2 (Terrestrial, with sport, family and health focus including regional variants)

Newspapers

 Al-Ba'ath
 Al-Thawra
 Tishreen
 Syria Times (defunct)
 Al-Watan
 Baladna
 Al-Iqtissadiya
 Enab Baladi

Film
The Syrian film industry is state-run by the Ministry of Culture, which controls production through the National Organization for Cinema. The industry is largely propaganda based, focusing on Syria's successes in agriculture, health, transportation and infrastructure.

Radio

There are over 4 million radios in Syria. They tend to broadcast music, ads and stories relating to culture. 
 Syrian Arab Republic Radio
 Alaan FM : Al Aan FM Launched in Syria in October 2012 broadcasting live from the UAE. Al Aan FM is available in the following cities and frequencies:

 FARAH FM 97.3
Al-Bukamal 96.6 MHz
Aleppo 96.6 MHz
Al Qunaitra 98.2 MHz
Atimah Camps 99.7 MHz
Azaz & Afrin 96.6 MHz
Al Bab & Manbij 104.4 MHz
Damascus 96.9 MHz
Daraa 96.9 and 99.4 MHz
Hama, Homs 97.6 MHz
Idlib 96.6 MHz
Kobani 96.7 MHz
Latakia 96.6 MHz
Qamishli & Amuda 97.6 MHz
Suwayda 96.9 and 99.4 MHz
Shaddadi (Ash Shaddadi) 97.6 MHz

 FARAH FM: www.farah.fm
 FARAH FM 97.3 Radio FARAH FM Syria
 Al-Madina FM: Syria's first private radio station

Online

Providing hosting services is a violation of United States sanctions. Some of the official Syrian government websites include:
 Syrian Arab News Agency (SANA)
 Ministry of Religious Affairs site
 General Authority for Development site
 Government of Hama, city website 

News agencies and online news services based in or targeted at Syria, several of which launched during the Syrian civil war, include:
 Al-Masdar News, sometimes criticized as sympathetic to the Syrian government
 Al-Watan, an online edition of Damascus-based Al-Watan newspaper, the 33rd most visited website for 2010 in the MENA region.
 ARA News, an online news service focussed on the consequences of war in Syria and Iraq, ceased operation in 2017.
 NOW News, a Beirut-based news website focused on the Middle East, with a special section on the developing situation in Syria.
 Syria-News, an Arabic language online press agency intended to report news about Syria.
 Syria NewsDesk, a Beirut-based Arabic news agency, focussed on the ordeal of the Syrian population, supported by the Dutch foundation "Free Press Unlimited".

Pro-rebel media
The public does have access to Western radio stations and satellite TV, and Qatar-based Al Jazeera has become very popular in Syria.

In August 2012, a media centre utilized by foreign reporters in Azaz was targeted by the Syrian Air Force in an airstrike on a civilian area during Ramadan.

Television

There are also satellite stations which broadcast outside Syria. Two of the primary satellite networks, Eutelsat and Nilesat, have recently expressed frustrations over the Syrian government preventing satellite TV transmissions broadcast from international outlets.

Satellite channels
Orient TV
Aleppo Today
Syria TV (Private)

Press
 Enab Baladi
 Al-Ghad: opposition paper
Al-Ahd (The Vow)- published by the Syrian Muslim Brotherhood
Brigades: published by a military brigade to raise questions about the origins of extremist Muslim fighters
Shaam-published by the Shaam News Network, which is an activist news organization.  It is privately financed.  Each 16-page edition includes coverage of culture, translation from foreign news sources and cartoons that are critical of the Assad government.

Radio

Internet and social media

With the breakdown of many traditional media outlets during the civil war, much of the current events are reported by individuals on Facebook and Twitter. However, the reliability of such reports can in many cases not be independently verified by credible news agencies. While many websites have appeared and publish a pro-opposition alternative to regime media, the lack of robust journalistic standards has often benefited the government since correctly denying news reports gives them more credibility.
 Raqqa Is Being Slaughtered Silently : Citizen journalism effort exposing human rights abuses by ISIS forces occupying the northern Syrian city of Raqqa.
Rojava Information Center: Journalism from the Autonomous Administration of North and East Syria.
 ANF News, a Netherlands-based multilingual online news service.
 Hawar News Agency (sometimes abbreviated ANHA) is an online Kurdish news service based in Al-Hasaka, Syria, said to be linked to the SDF.
 Ekurd.net, an English language online newspaper for Kurds since January 2015, based in New York. The editorial team is known, though its owners are not.
 Orient Net, a Dubai-based Arabic and English language online newspaper concerned with Syrian affairs.
 SMART News Agency, standing for "Syrian Media Action Revolution Team", a France-based Arabic language opposition media network. Shut down in 2020.

Prohibitive measures against media

State of emergency law
The constitution of the Syrian Arab Republic guaranteed the right to a free press and freedom of expression, but Syria was under a highly restrictive state of emergency law since the Ba'ath Party came to power in 1964 until 2011. Anyone wishing to establish an independent paper or periodical must apply for a license from the Ministry of Information. In 2011 the state of emergency was lifted. This seems to have had no effect what-so-ever on the way the government conducted itself regarding the media, with Syria's ranking actually worsening the following year with journalistic organizations such as the Committee to Protect Journalists, and Reporters Without Borders both ranking Syria as one of the top four most repressive countries in the world.

Internet censorship

There are over 5 million Internet users in Syria. Reporters Without Borders lists Syria as an “internet enemy” due to high levels of censorship. The Internet is controlled by the Syrian Computer Society (SCS) and the Syrian Telecommunications Establishment (STE). The government monitors activity through the hacking of emails and social networking accounts and phishing.  Simultaneously, the government releases pro-Assad propaganda and false information to support its cause. The law requires Internet cafes to record all comments in the online chatrooms. There was a two-day Internet blackout in 2012, which was likely orchestrated by the government. Authorities have blocked journalists and bloggers from attending and reporting on events by arresting and torturing them. This is not limited to Syrian journalists as members of the Associated Press and Reuters have been arrested and expelled from the country for their reporting.

Press freedom
Reporters Without Borders ranked Syria 171st out of 180 countries in the world on the Press Freedom Index in May 2022.  On the Press Freedom Barometer for 2022, the organization reports that 1 journalist has been killed, while 27 journalists and 2 media workers have been imprisoned.

See also
 Cinema of Syria
 List of newspapers in Syria
 List of radio stations in Syria
 List of Syrian films
 Syrian Civil War
 Media coverage of the Syrian Civil War
 Telecommunications in Syria
 Television in Syria

References

Further reading
Joseph Daher Syria, the uprising and the media scene, OpenDemocracy 26 October 2017

External links

 

 
Syria
Syria